The Big Duck is a ferrocement building in the shape of a duck located in Flanders, New York, on Long Island. It was originally built in 1931 by duck farmer Martin Maurer in nearby Riverhead, and used as a shop to sell ducks and duck eggs.  It was added to the National Register of Historic Places in 1997.  It is a principal building on the Big Duck Ranch, listed on the National Register of Historic Places in 2008.

Description
The Big Duck is a huge duck-shaped building. The wood frame, wire mesh/concrete surface building was designed in the shape of a Pekin duck in order to house a retail poultry store.

History
Owner Martin Maurer had The Big Duck building constructed in 1930 and 1931 on a prime spot on the busy Main Street in the town of Riverhead on Long Island, New York. The builders Smith and Yeager completed the concrete finish work on the Big Duck which was featured in Atlas Cement's 1931 calendar.   Merlin Yeager noted that most of the duck is actually finished with Portland Cement, but they ran out and finished with Atlas Cement.  The Big Duck was also featured in Popular Mechanics magazine.

In 1937, Martin Maurer moved the building four miles (6 km) southeast to Flanders, where it occupied a prominent location near the duck barns and marshes of Maurer's new duck ranch. The entire area, including Flanders and Riverhead, was the center of Long Island's well-known duck-farming industry. By 1939 there were about 90 duck farms in Suffolk County.

The Big Duck's unusual building and prime location helped garner much customer attention until it closed in 1984. In 1988, Suffolk County acquired The Big Duck and moved it to Route 24 on the edge of Sears-Bellows Pond County Park between Flanders and Hampton Bays on the eastern part of Long Island. The building houses a gift shop operated by the Friends for Long Island Heritage. In 2004, there was a movement to move the duck to Long Island MacArthur Airport, but the duck was returned to its Flanders location on October 6, 2007.  Suffolk County continues to own it, maintains its interior and pays for staffing; Southampton Town maintains the exterior. The original  duck farm was purchased by the town in 2006. It currently serves as a gift shop selling memorabilia.

Christie Brinkley lent her voice to a tape greeting for visitors.

The Big Duck was used as a setting in a sketch from the children's TV series Between the Lions called Moby Duck, a parody of Moby Dick. In this sketch, the duck was named Moby, and two sailors were enlisted on a voyage to search for the duck, although it was right behind them the whole time.

As of November 2017, for the past 29 years at Christmas time, the Big Duck has been lit up with Christmas lights placed along a giant wreath which hangs around the duck's neck.  Local residents hold a Christmas lighting ceremony each year when the lights are turned on, and the ceremony is covered by local news.

Legacy
Buildings such as this are classified as novelty architecture. However, in architecture the term "duck" is used more specifically to describe buildings that are in the shape of an everyday object to which they relate. According to the Long Island newspaper Newsday, "The Big Duck has influenced the world of architecture; any building that is shaped like its product is called a 'duck'." Edward Tufte's The Visual Display of Quantitative Information uses the term "duck", explicitly named after this building, to describe irrelevant decorative elements in information design.
The Big Duck was the target of widespread criticism during the 1960s and early 1970s but the building did have its architectural defenders. Robert Venturi and Denise Scott Brown said that since the building combined functional and symbolic aspects of architecture it was noteworthy. It was Venturi and Scott Brown who coined the term "duck" to describe a building in which the architecture is subordinate to the overall symbolic form.  However, they preferred the "decorated shed" as a model. On November 13, 2006, radio station WBLI rated the Flanders Duck first amongst the 7 wonders of Long Island, just ahead of the Commack Motor Inn.

See also 
 Architecture parlante
 Big Chicken
 Randy's Donuts

References

External links 

 Official Site
 Big Duck Photo Gallery

Novelty buildings in New York (state)
Commercial buildings on the National Register of Historic Places in New York (state)
National Register of Historic Places in Southampton (town), New York
Roadside attractions in New York (state)
Tourist attractions on Long Island
Commercial buildings completed in 1931
Tourist attractions in Suffolk County, New York
1931 establishments in New York (state)
Ducks in popular culture